Misty Pass is a pass,  high, between the head of Broad Valley and Ogoya Glacier descending north to Bransfield Strait, situated  southeast of Cape Ducorps on Trinity Peninsula, Antarctica. It was mapped by the Falkland Islands Dependencies Survey in 1946, and so named because clouds pouring east through the pass had been noted by the survey party to herald bad weather.

Map
 Trinity Peninsula. Scale 1:250000 topographic map No. 5697. Institut für Angewandte Geodäsie and British Antarctic Survey, 1996.

References

Mountain passes of Trinity Peninsula